Christian André (born 14 August 1950) is a French former professional footballer who played as a forward.

Career 
André, who is originally from Martinique, was recruited by Paris Saint-Germain in 1972 alongside fellow Trinitaire Jacques Laposte, after the club had been relegated to the Division 3 following a split with Paris FC. In his first season with PSG, he quickly established himself as a key player of Robert Vicot's side. Nicknamed the "black panther",  André scored 21 goals in 30 Division 3 games to help the Parisian club achieve promotion to the Division 2. He was PSG's top scorer during the 1972–73 season.

In his second season at the club, André still played a key part in the team. He would score 14 across all competitions, PSG now being promoted for the second time in a row, this time joining the elite in the Division 1. André would continue with PSG in the first tier, playing several matches, but was relegated to the bench. The arrivals of Mustapha Dahleb and François M'Pelé, players in competition with André, contributed to this.

In the 1974–75 season, André suffered a knee ligament injury. He would be loaned out to Red Star in January 1975, and returned from the loan 18 months later. However, upon his return, he was unable to establish himself in the squad, and signed for Béziers in 1977. André stayed one season at Béziers before signing for Montpellier in 1978, where he would also stay one season before retiring.

After football 
After retiring, André would pursue a coaching career in his native Martinique. On his return to metropolitan France, he would coach young players in Gagny in 2003 before being responsible of football pitches in the Paris area. Later, André would go live in Provence and Corsica.

References

External links 
 

1950 births
Living people
French footballers
Martiniquais footballers
French people of Martiniquais descent
Black French sportspeople
Association football forwards
People from La Trinité, Martinique
AS Samaritaine players
Paris Saint-Germain F.C. players
Red Star F.C. players
AS Béziers Hérault (football) players
Montpellier HSC players
French Division 3 (1971–1993) players
Ligue 2 players
Ligue 1 players